The Walker Woolen Mill was built in Wilton, Maine, in 1840, using virgin and virtually extinct forest pine from the southern United States. It was largely built over the next 40–50 years, with local large local pine and wood eventually shipped using the transcontinental Railroad. 

Maine is the most wooded state in the USA, and has a long history of manufacturing everything from shoes to paper.  Owner Charles Forster is called the "father of the toothpick" and built the world's first toothpick mill here in 1881.

Once owned by New York Real estate magnate Donald Trump as part of a greater acquisition of other properties, the site is famous enough to commonly have its own postcard still sold on eBay, and a lively recent history, with recent attempts to dismantle it and sell the steel and wood that started growing 600 years ago coming against funding issues. 

Plans to take do a "hybrid deconstruction" will necessitate using one of the world's largest excavators to gently take down the four story structure and salvage the materials are in the works and expected to commence April 2013.

References

Industrial buildings completed in 1840
Wilton, Maine
Textile mills in Maine
Wooden buildings and structures in the United States
Buildings and structures in Franklin County, Maine
Economy of Franklin County, Maine